The Chase is a 1966 American drama film, directed by Arthur Penn and starring Marlon Brando, Jane Fonda, and Robert Redford. It tells the story of a series of events that are set into motion by a prison break. The film also features E.G. Marshall, Angie Dickinson, Janice Rule, Miriam Hopkins, Martha Hyer, Robert Duvall, and James Fox.

Plot
In the mid-1960s, in a small town in Tarl County, Texas, where banker Val Rogers (E.G. Marshall) wields a great deal of influence, word comes that native son Bubber Reeves (Robert Redford) and another man have escaped from prison.

Sheriff Calder (Marlon Brando), who continues to believe in Bubber's innocence, expects him to return to his hometown, where Bubber's lonely wife Anna (Jane Fonda)  is involved in a romantic affair with Jake (James Fox), Bubber's best friend and Val Rogers' son.

Bubber is left on his own after the second fugitive kills a stranger for his car and clothes. The townspeople, conflicted about his guilt or innocence, socialize and drink heavily while awaiting Bubber's return. They include the hostile Emily Stewart (Janice Rule), who openly expresses her lust for Damon Fuller (Richard Bradford) in front of her husband Edwin (Robert Duvall).

As the drinking and quarreling intensify, a group of vigilantes demand action from Calder. When he defies them, they beat Calder brutally before the sheriff's loyal wife Ruby (Angie Dickinson) is able to get to his side.

Bubber sneaks into town, hiding in an auto junkyard. Anna and Jake willingly set out to help him, and the townspeople follow, turning the event into a drunken revelry and setting the junkyard on fire, causing an explosion which mortally wounds Jake. A bloodied and beaten Calder manages to get to Bubber first, but while he is leading him up the steps into the jail, one of the vigilantes, Archie (Steve Ihnat), shoots Bubber multiple times with a gun hidden in his coat pocket.

Sick of the town and its people, Calder and Ruby leave town the next morning.

Cast
 Marlon Brando as Sheriff Calder
 Jane Fonda as Anna Reeves
 Robert Redford as Charlie "Bubber" Reeves
 E.G. Marshall as Val Rogers
 Angie Dickinson as Ruby Calder
 Janice Rule as Emily Stewart
 Miriam Hopkins as Mrs. Reeves
 Martha Hyer as Mary Fuller
 Richard Bradford as Damon Fuller
 Robert Duvall as Edwin Stewart
 James Fox as Jason "Jake" Rogers
 Diana Hyland as Elizabeth Rogers
 Henry Hull as Briggs
 Jocelyn Brando as Mrs. Briggs
 Bruce Cabot as Sol
 Katherine Walsh as Verna Dee
 Lori Martin as Cutie
 Marc Seaton as Paul (as Marc Skaton)
 Paul Williams as Seymour
 Clifton James as Lem
 Malcolm Atterbury as Mr. Reeves
 Steve Ihnat as Archie
 Joel Fluellen as Lester Johnson
 Ken Renard as Sam
 Eduardo Ciannelli as inarticulate party guest (uncredited)

Outline and production
The film deals with excessive immorality and vice such as themes of racism (including scenes in which black men are harassed by white men), sexual revolution (many of the characters are openly engaged in affairs), small-town corruption (the sheriff is falsely assumed to be in the pocket of the man who helped appoint him), and vigilantism (in the form of townspeople who openly defy the sheriff in their search for Bubber). The movie is perhaps best known for a scene in which the sheriff, played by Marlon Brando, is brutally beaten by Richard Bradford, one of the three vigilantes.

Paul Williams thought this movie would be his big break, but after working on the film for three months, he was shown on screen for a few moments and had "two lines" in the final film. Faye Dunaway auditioned for the film, but Jane Fonda was cast in the role of Anna Reeves. Following this, Arthur Penn tested Dunaway and cast her for Bonnie and Clyde.

Reception
On release, the film gained generally positive reviews from critics, but Richard Schickel was dismissive in Life magazine. Pointing out its origins in the Horton Foote play, he wrote: "The Chase is no longer a modest failure...it has been turned into a disaster of awesome proportions".

During an interview years after the film was released, Arthur Penn expressed his dissatisfaction with the film: "Everything in that film was a letdown, and I'm sure every director has gone through the same experience at least once. It's a shame because it could have been a great film."

See also
List of American films of 1966

References

Further reading

External links

 
 
 
 
 
 DVD Savant comprehensive DVD review by Glenn Erickson
 Movie Poop Shoot - DVD DiaTribe  Read the second review on this page by D.K. Holm

1966 films
Adultery in films
Columbia Pictures films
Films scored by John Barry (composer)
Films based on adaptations
Films based on American novels
American films based on plays
Films directed by Arthur Penn
Films produced by Sam Spiegel
Films set in Texas
American vigilante films
1960s vigilante films
1960s English-language films
1960s American films